Agriotypus armatus is a species of insect belonging to the family Ichneumonidae.

It is native to Europe and Russian Far East.

References

Ichneumonidae